Ash's lark (Mirafra ashi) or Ash's bushlark, is a species of lark in the family Alaudidae endemic to Somalia.

Taxonomy and systematics 
The bird's common name and Latin binomial commemorate the British ornithologist John Sidney Ash.

Description 
Ash's lark is typically  in length. It has greyish-brown upperparts with paler edging to its mantle feathers, a buff-coloured underbelly and underparts with brownish streaks, a paler belly and vent, a light crest, and buff eyebrow stripes.

Such a description is insufficient, however, since as with some other lark species it is difficult to definitively describe the bird without comparison to its close relatives. In the case of Ash's lark, it is smaller than the rufous-naped lark or the red-winged lark, and more greyish and marked on its mantle than either the singing lark (which has a thicker bill) or the pink-breasted lark (which has a pinkish breast).

Its songs have yet to be identified.

Distribution and habitat 
Population data of Ash's lark from recent decades has been greatly lacking. Political unrest has prevented accurate fieldwork in the region for many years.

Even here where it is locally common, however, Ash's lark is easily overlooked because it shares the area with nine other species of lark, including both the red-winged lark and Somali long-billed lark. It is possible that Ash's lark is also present along the coast somewhat to the north of its known range since much of this land is little explored by ornithologists.

Its natural habitat is subtropical or tropical dry lowland grassland.

Behaviour and ecology
Typical behaviour is to run across bare ground between bunches of grass prior to perching atop a tussock. It is threatened by habitat loss to coastal development.

At present, little is known of Ash's lark's ecological relationships.

References 

Ash's lark
Endemic birds of Somalia
Ash's lark
Ash's lark
Taxonomy articles created by Polbot
Hobyo grasslands and shrublands